9012Live is a 1985 concert film featuring the English rock band Yes, recorded at the Northlands Coliseum in Edmonton, Alberta, Canada on 28 and 29 September 1984 on the band's tour in support of their eleventh studio album, 90125 (1983). The film features a line-up of singer Jon Anderson, guitarist Trevor Rabin, keyboardist Tony Kaye, bassist Chris Squire, and drummer Alan White. In addition to the concert performance, the film includes special effects by Charlex and a colourised version of the short film Young Man's Fancy (1952), produced by Edison Electric.

9012Live was released on VHS and aired on MTV in November 1985 as a companion release to the live album 9012Live: The Solos. It was released on DVD in 2006 with bonus footage and a director's cut without the effects and stock footage. The film was directed by future Academy Award-winner Steven Soderbergh; he and the group were nominated for a Grammy Award for Best Music Video, Long Form for the release. The film's ending features the quote "The rhythm of big generators", which inspired the name of Yes' next album, Big Generator (1987).

Personnel
Jon Anderson: lead and backing vocals, guitar, keyboards
Trevor Rabin: guitar, lead and backing vocals
Chris Squire: bass, backing vocals
Tony Kaye: keyboards, backing vocals on "Leave It"
Alan White: drums, backing vocals on "Leave It"

Track listing
 "Cinema"
 "Leave It"
 "Hold On"
 "I've Seen All Good People"
 "Changes"
 "Make It Easy (Intro)" – "Owner of a Lonely Heart"
 "It Can Happen"
 "City of Love"
 "Starship Trooper"

Bonus features on DVD 
 Special director's cut - This features only live footage of the band, omitting the Charlex effects. It includes all the songs from the main portion of the DVD, in the same order.
 "Roundabout" - a performance of "Roundabout" that was omitted from the original release
 Access All Areas documentary
 Band interviews

Certifications

References

External links
 
 

1985 live albums
1985 video albums
Live video albums
Yes (band) video albums
Films directed by Steven Soderbergh
1980s English-language films